The 1901 Indiana Hoosiers football team was an American football team that represented Indiana University during the 1901 Western Conference football season. In its fourth season under head coach James H. Horne, the team compiled a 6–3 record and outscored opponents by a total of 214 to 87.

Schedule

References

Indiana
Indiana Hoosiers football seasons
Indiana Hoosiers football